Kristian Rambjør (24 February 1938 – 4 February 2015) was a Norwegian businessperson.

He hailed from Frei, but left home at the age of 15 to work at Akers mekaniske verksted in Oslo. He also took a secondary education and a multitude of courses, and then a three-year maritime engineering education in Bergen.

He advanced in the ranks of Akers Mek. and headed the corporate staff in Aker Norcem from 1987 to 1988. He then embarked on a turbulent banking career, as chief executive officer of Den norske Creditbank from 1988 to 1990, then vice chief executive in Den norske Bank in 1990.

He resided in Tjøme and was active in the Conservative Party there. He died in February 2015.

References

1938 births
2015 deaths
People from Kristiansund
Norwegian bankers
Directors of government agencies of Norway
Norwegian State Railways (1883–1996) people